Ronny Abraham is a French academic and practitioner in the field of public international law who was elected to the International Court of Justice, to fill the vacancy created by the resignation of judge and former President Gilbert Guillaume. He served the remainder of Guillaume's which ended on 5 February 2009, and was reelected for a term extending to 2018.

Biography
Abraham was born on 5 September 1951 in Alexandria, Egypt. He earned his degree in Advanced Studies in Public Law at the  Panthéon-Sorbonne, is an alumnus of National School of Administration and led a distinguished career characterised by numerous academic and judicial postings, which include:

 Administrative Tribunal Judge (1978–1985 and 1987–1988)
 Assistant Director of the Office of Legal Affairs of the Ministry of Foreign Affairs (1986–1987)
 At the Council of State,
 Maître des requêtes (1988–2000)
 Conseiller d’État (since 2000)
 Government Commissioner within the judicial system (1989–1998).
 Director of Legal Affairs of the Ministry of Foreign Affairs (since October 1998).
 Professor at Panthéon-Assas University (since 2004)

As head of the Office of Legal Affairs of the Ministry of Foreign Affairs since 1998, he has acted as legal adviser to the Government in the areas of general international public law, European Union law, international human rights law, Law of the Sea and laws on the Antarctic.

Since 1998 he has been a representative for France in many cases before international and European courts.

Lectures
 La Cour internationale de Justice à l'aube de son soixante-dixième anniversaire in the Lecture Series of the United Nations Audiovisual Library of International Law

References

1951 births
Living people
International Court of Justice judges
French judges of United Nations courts and tribunals
Presidents of the International Court of Justice

мошенник